Silver Street is a London Overground station on the Lea Valley lines located in Edmonton in the London Borough of Enfield, north London.

Its three-letter station code is SLV and it is in Travelcard zone 4.

Description

Looking north, the platforms at  can be seen (there is just  between the two stops) whilst looking south, trains leaving  are seen almost immediately as they leave that station (it being only  from Silver Street).

The station takes its name from the street so-called which is recorded thus  1630 and which possibly alludes to silversmiths living in the area at that time or before. The street used to include the part of Sterling Way which now runs past the station.

History
Silver Street was originally a stop on the Stoke Newington & Edmonton Railway and opened on 22 July 1872.

Several changes were made to Silver Street station in the early 1980s. Two wooden covered staircases leading up to the platforms were replaced by open-air concrete staircases. The northbound platform roof was removed and replaced with a simple brick shelter.

A fire on the London-bound platforms in the 1990s damaged much of the original roof. A new modern structure was put in its place alongside the remaining undamaged portion.

The Fore Street tunnel section of the North Circular Road was built beneath the station during the 1990s without any disruption to service. At this time, a new ticket hall was constructed on the eastern side of the station.

In 2015 the station and all services that call transferred from Abellio Greater Anglia operation to become part of the London Overground network. Silver Street was added to the Tube map at the same time.

Services
Trains are operated by London Overground.

Connections
London Buses routes 34, 102, 144, 444, 456 and 491 serve the station.

References

External links

Railway stations in the London Borough of Enfield
Former Great Eastern Railway stations
Railway stations in Great Britain opened in 1872

Edmonton, London
Railway stations served by London Overground